The Family Responsibility Office (FRO) is an office of the Government of Ontario responsible for collecting, distributing, and enforcing court-ordered child (and spousal) support payments in the province. It was established during Marion Boyd's two-year run as Attorney General of Ontario.

The FRO operates under the auspices of the Ministry of Community and Social Services and executive director Trevor Sparrow.

See also 
 Ontario Ombudsman §Complaints Procedure

External links 
 FRO — What we do, from the Ministry's website

Ontario government departments and agencies